Tullibody Old Kirk is a ruined 12th-century church in Tullibody, Clackmannanshire, Scotland. It was rebuilt in the 16th century, and restored again in 1760. The roofless building is protected as a Scheduled Ancient Monument. In 1904, St Serf's Parish Church was built to the north of the Old Kirk, which was afterwards disused.

The church measures . The bellcote on the western gable dates from 1772, while the western windows and the south porch are 19th-century additions. Two doorways survive from the 16th century, including one dated 1539.

Monuments
Significant monuments include that of George Abercromby (d.1699), and the Haig memorial on the north wall. The surrounding burial ground is a Category B listed building.

During the Scottish Reformation, William Kirkcaldy destroyed the bridge at Tullibody in an attempt to  prevent French troops from retreating to the Siege of Leith at the end of January 1560. However, the French removed the roof of Tullibody Kirk and used it to bridge the Devon.

References

12th-century church buildings in Scotland
Churches in Clackmannanshire
Listed churches in Scotland
Scheduled Ancient Monuments in Clackmannanshire